The Gurdon Institute (officially the Wellcome/Cancer Research UK Gurdon Institute) is a research facility at the University of Cambridge, specialising in developmental biology and cancer biology.

History
The Institute was founded in 1989 to provide a rich, collaborative environment for scientists working in diverse but complementary specialities in the fields of developmental biology and cancer biology. It receives its primary funding from the Wellcome Trust and Cancer Research UK.

In 2004 it was renamed in honour of John Gurdon, joint winner of the 2012 Nobel Prize for medicine.  the director is Julie Ahringer and the deputy director is Eric Miska.

Faculty
 there are 15 Group Leaders and 2 Associate Group Leaders.

Group Leaders:

Julie Ahringer
Andrea Brand
Jenny Gallop
John Gurdon
Steve Jackson
Tony Kouzarides
Hansong Ma
Eric Miska
Emma Rawlins
Ben Simons
Daniel St Johnston
Azim Surani
Iva Tchasovnikarova (beginning Summer 2020)
Fengzhu Xiong
Philip Zegerman
Associate Group Leaders:
Martin Hemberg
John Perry

Alumni
Former Group Leaders:

Michael Akam
Enrique Amaya
Nick Brown
Rafael Carazo Salas
Thomas Down
Martin Evans
Charles ffrench-Constant
Janet Heasman
Meritxell Huch
Ron Laskey
Rick Livesey
Anne McLaren
Masanori Mishima
Nancy Papalopulu
Eugenia Piddini
Jonathon Pines
Jordan Raff
Jim Smith
Chris Wylie
Magdalena Zernicka-Goetz

References

Institutions in the School of the Biological Sciences, University of Cambridge
Cancer organisations based in the United Kingdom
Research institutes established in 1989
1989 establishments in England